Ryu Se-ra (born October 3, 1987), also known by the mononym Sera, is a South Korean singer-songwriter signed under the self-founded agency OCTO. She is a former leader and main vocalist of South Korean girl group Nine Muses.

Career

2010–2014: Debut with Nine Muses 
On August 12, 2010, Ryu debuted as part of the girl group Nine Muses. Later, she became the leader and main vocalist of the group, following the departure of former leader Rana. On June 23, 2014, Star Empire announced that Ryu's exclusive contract had expired and she announced that she had also left the group.

2015–present: Solo activities and new agency
On August 1, 2015, Ryu released her first solo indie EP album "SeRen:Ade".
In September 2015, Ryu held her first solo concert in Hongdae, for which 600 people attended.

In March 2018, Ryu founded a new agency OCTO and announced that she would continue solo activities with her real name, Ryu Se-ra. An agency official has stated that the name OCTO carries a meaning of a new beginning. On March 2, Ryu released a single album "Stay Real", managed and published by her new agency. Later that month, Ryu held a second solo concert titled "Spring Rain" at Olympic Hall Muse Live stage, followed by a concert titled "Sun Shower" held on June 23, 2018, at CKL stage. Since 2014, Ryu has been active on YouTube where she shares her solo activities and song covers with her fans. She appeared as a contestant on the music survival reality show Miss Back between October 8, 2020, and January 26, 2021, where she became a finalist.

Discography

Extended plays

Single albums

Singles

Filmography

TV series

Reality shows

Documentary

Endorsements
 [2011] CJ Condition Raisin Tree Drink (with Oh Ji-ho)
 [2013] Hug Ozawa's Eyes Cloud Glasses
 [2013] Jinjusangdan Hanboks

Modelling career
 2011 Seoul Fashion Week
 2012 Korean International Style Show in Japan
 2012 K-Collection in Seoul
 2012 K-pop Nature Concert in Jeju

References

1987 births
Living people
South Korean female idols
Musicians from Busan
21st-century South Korean singers
21st-century South Korean women singers